The status of religious freedom in Asia varies from country to country. States can differ based on whether or not they guarantee equal treatment under law for followers of different religions, whether they establish a state religion (and the legal implications that this has for both practitioners and non-practitioners), the extent to which religious organizations operating within the country are policed, and the extent to which religious law is used as a basis for the country's legal code.

There are further discrepancies between some countries' self-proclaimed stances of religious freedom in law and the actual practice of authority bodies within those countries: a country's establishment of religious equality in their constitution or laws does not necessarily translate into freedom of practice for residents of the country. Additionally, similar practices (such as having citizens identify their religious preference to the government or on identification cards) can have different consequences depending on other sociopolitical circumstances specific to the countries in question.
Most countries in Asia officially establish the freedom of religion by law, but the extent to which this is enforced varies. Some countries have anti-discrimination laws, and others have anti-blasphemy laws. Legal religious discrimination is present in many countries in Asia.United States Bureau of Democracy, Human Rights and Labor. Bahrain: International Religious Freedom Report 2007. This article incorporates text from this source, which is in the public domain. Some countries also have significantly restricted the activities of Islamic groups that they have identified as fundamentalist. Several countries ban proselytization, either in general or for specific religious groups.United States Bureau of Democracy, Human Rights and Labor. Armenia: International Religious Freedom Report 2007. Tajikistan, and Turkmenistan have significant restrictions against the practice of religion in general, and other countries like China discourage it on a wide basis.United States Bureau of Democracy, Human Rights and Labor. Turkmenistan: International Religious Freedom Report 2007.
Several countries in Asia establish a state religion, with Islam (usually Sunni Islam) being the most common, followed by Buddhism. Lebanon and Iran, as well as the Democratic Federation of Northern Syria have established confessionalist political systems which guarantee set levels of representation in government to specific religious groups in the country. Some majority Muslim countries have Islamic religious courts, with varying degrees of jurisdiction. The governments of some Muslim countries play an active role in overseeing and directing form of Muslim religious practice within their country.See the 2008 Human Rights Report of the Bureau of Democracy, Human Rights and Labor (US State Department) of 25 February 2009; accessed on 21 September 2009

Societal levels of religious tolerance vary greatly across Asia. Groups negatively affected include Muslims, Christians, Jews, Buddhists, atheists and Hindus. 

Religious violence is present in several countries, with varying degrees of support or intervention from local governments. Groups including Muslims, Christians, Buddhists, Hindus, and atheists face religiously motivated violence.

Afghanistan

Afghanistan is an Islamic republic where Islam is practiced by 99.7% of its population. Roughly 90% of the Afghans follow Sunni Islam, with the rest practicing Shia Islam. Apart from Muslims, there are also small minorities of Sikhs and Hindus.

The Constitution of Afghanistan established on January 23, 2004, mandates that:

 Afghanistan shall be an Islamic Republic, independent, unitary, and an indivisible state.
 The sacred religion of Islam shall be the religion of the Islamic Republic of Afghanistan. Followers of other faiths shall be free within the bounds of law in the exercise and performance of their religious rights.
 No law shall contravene the tenets and provisions of the holy religion of Islam in Afghanistan.

In practice, the constitution limits the political rights of Afghanistan's non-Muslims, and only Muslims are allowed to become the President.

In March 2015, a 27-year-old Afghan woman was murdered by a mob in Kabul over false allegations of burning a copy of the Koran. After beating and kicking Farkhunda, the mob threw her over a bridge, set her body on fire and threw it in the river.

Taliban controlled regions 
Historically, the Taliban, which controlled Afghanistan from 1996 to 2001, prohibited free speech about religious issues or discussions that challenge orthodox Sunni Muslim views. Repression by the Taliban of the Hazara ethnic group, which is predominantly Shia Muslim, was particularly severe. Although the conflict between the Hazaras and the Taliban was political and military as well as religious, and it is not possible to state with certainty that the Taliban engaged in its campaign against the Shi'a solely because of their religious beliefs, the religious affiliation of the Hazaras apparently was a significant factor leading to their repression. After the United States invasion of Afghanistan in 2001, the Taliban was forced out of power and began an insurgency against the new government and allied US forces. The Taliban continues to prohibit music, movies, and television on religious grounds in areas that it still holds.

According to the U.S. Military, the Taliban controls 10% of Afghanistan as of December 2017. There are also pockets of territory controlled by Islamic State affiliates. On October 14, 2017, The Guardian reported that there were then between 600 and 800 ISIL-KP militants left in Afghanistan, who are mostly concentrated in Nangarhar Province.

Armenia

As of 2011, most Armenians are Christians (94.8%) and members of Armenia's own church, the Armenian Apostolic Church.

The Constitution of Armenia as amended in December 2005 provides for freedom of religion; however, the law places some restrictions on the religious freedom of adherents of minority religious groups, and there were some restrictions in practice. The Armenian Apostolic Church which has formal legal status as the national church, enjoys some privileges not available to other religious groups. Some denominations reported occasional discrimination by mid- or low-level government officials but found high-level officials to be tolerant. Societal attitudes toward some minority religious groups were ambivalent, and there were reports of societal discrimination directed against members of these groups.

The law does not mandate registration of nongovernmental organizations (NGOs), including religious groups; however, only registered organizations have legal status. Only registered groups may publish newspapers or magazines, rent meeting places, broadcast programs on television or radio, or officially sponsor the visas of visitors, although there is no prohibition on individual members doing so. There were no reports of the Government refusing registration to religious groups that qualified for registration under the law. To qualify for registration, religious organizations must "be free from materialism and of a purely spiritual nature," and must subscribe to a doctrine based on "historically recognized holy scriptures." The Office of the State Registrar registers religious entities. The Department of Religious Affairs and National Minorities oversees religious affairs and performs a consultative role in the registration process. A religious organization must have at least 200 adult members to register.

The Law on Freedom of Conscience prohibits "proselytizing" but does not define it. The prohibition applies to all groups, including the Armenian Church. Most registered religious groups reported no serious legal impediments to their activities.

Azerbaijan

The Constitution of Azerbaijan provides that persons of all faiths may choose and practice their religion without restriction, although, some sources state that there have been some abuses and restrictions. Azerbaijan is a majority Muslim country. Various estimates calculate that upwards of 95% of the population identify as Muslim. Most are adherents of Shia branch with a minority (15%) being Sunni Muslim, although differences traditionally have not been defined sharply. For many Azerbaijanis, Islam tends toward a more ethnic/nationalistic identity than a purely religious one.

Religious groups are required by law to register with the State Committee on Religious Associations of the Republic of Azerbaijan. Organizations which fail to register may be considered illegal and may be forbidden to operate within Azerbaijan. Some religious groups reported delays in and denials of their registration attempts. There are limitations upon the ability of groups to import religious literature. Most religious groups met without government interference; however, local authorities monitored religious services, and officials at times harassed and detained members of "nontraditional" religious groups. There were some reports of societal abuses or discrimination based on religious belief or practice. The US. State Department reported prejudice against Muslims who convert to other faiths and hostility toward groups that proselytize, particularly evangelical Christian and other missionary groups, as well as Iranian groups and Salafists, who are seen as a threat to security.

Bahrain 

The constitution of Bahrain states that Islam is the official religion and that Shari'a (Islamic law) is a principal source for legislation. Article 22 of the Constitution provides for freedom of conscience, the inviolability of worship, and the freedom to perform religious rites and hold religious parades and meetings, in accordance with the customs observed in the country; however, the government placed some limitations on the exercise of this right. Shi'a Muslims are discriminated against by the government socially and economically, although the government still supports Shi'a religious institutions financially.

The government of Bahrain allows religion-based, political nongovernmental organizations to register as political "societies", which operate somewhat like parties with the legal authority to conduct political activities. The law prohibits the publication of anti-Islamic publications; other religious groups have reported that they have faced no obstacles buying or selling their own religious texts.

Holding a religious meeting without a permit is illegal; however, there have been no reports of religious groups being denied a permit to gather. The High Council for Islamic Affairs is charged with the review and approval of all clerical appointments within both the Sunni and Shi'a communities and maintains program oversight for all citizens studying religion abroad. Historically there is evidence of discrimination against Shi'a Muslims in recruitment for the country's military and domestic security services.

The government funds all official religious institutions, including Shi'a and Sunni mosques, Shi'a ma`tams (religious community centers), Shi'a and Sunni waqfs (religious endowments), and the religious courts, which represent both the Ja'afari (Shi'a) and Maliki (Sunni) schools of Islamic jurisprudence. The Government permits public religious events, most notably the large annual commemorative marches by Shi'a Muslims during the Islamic months of Ramadan and Muharram.

Islamic studies are a part of the curriculum in government schools and mandatory for all public school students. The decades-old curriculum is based on the Maliki school of Sunni theology. Proposals to include the Ja'afari traditions of Shi'a Islam in the curriculum have been rejected. The civil and criminal legal systems consist of a complex mix of courts based on diverse legal sources, including Sunni and Shi'a Shari'a, tribal law, and other civil codes and regulations.

Interventions against the Shi'a community 
During the 2011–2012 Arab Spring uprising and crackdown against Shia protest in Bahrain, "dozens" of Shia mosques [were] leveled by the government according to a report in McClatchy newspapers. According to Shiite leaders interviewed by the reporter, work crews have often arrived "in the dead of night, accompanied by police and military escorts", to demolish the mosques, and in many cases, have hauled away the buildings' rubble before townspeople awake so as to leave no trace. Sheikh Khalid bin Ali bin Abdulla al Khalifa, the minister of justice and Islamic affairs for Bahrain, defended the demolitions stating: "These are not mosques. These are illegal buildings." However the McClatchy reporter found that photos taken of several mosques before their destruction by the government "showed they were well maintained, decades-old structures."

Since 2016, Sheikh Isa Qassim, a leading Shi'a figure, has been under house arrest. Protests around his home in June 2016 resulted in 5 deaths, 286 arrests, and 31 injured police officers

In 2017, militant groups attacked police forces with improvised explosive devices, killing four. The militant groups justified their attacks with Shi'a rhetoric, and in response the government prosecuted members of the Shi'a community, as well as blaming Iran for providing material aid to the militant groups.

Status of Jewish community 

Jewish people in Bahrain regularly practice their faith privately without interference from the government or fear of harassment. While some anti-Zionist political commentary and editorial cartoons appeared, usually linked to the Israeli–Palestinian conflict, outside of a political context the Jewish minority is fully respected and allowed to operate freely. In 2008 Bahrain named Houda Ezra Ebrahim Nonoo, a Jewish female lawmaker, ambassador to the United States.

Bangladesh 

Bangladesh was founded as a secular state, but Islam was made the state religion in the 1980s. However, in 2010, the High Court held up the secular principles of the 1972 constitution. The Constitution of Bangladesh establishes Islam as the state religion but also allows other religions to be practiced in harmony.

While the government of Bangladesh does not interfere in the free practice of religion by people within its borders, incidences of individual violence against minority groups are common. In particular, Chakma Buddhists, Hindus, Christians, and Ahmadiyya Muslims are subject to persecution. Additionally, atheists face persecution, with prominent bloggers having been assassinated by radical groups, such as the Ansarullah Bangla Team.

Family law concerning marriage, divorce, and adoption has separate provisions for Muslims, Hindus, and Christians. These laws are enforced in the same secular courts. A separate civil family law applies to mixed faith families or those of other faiths or no faith.

The government operates training academies for imams, and monitors the content of religious education in Islamic religious schools, or madrassahs, and announced its intention to make changes to the curriculum, including modernising and mainstreaming the content of religious education.

In 2013, Supreme Court deregistered the Jamaat-e-Islami, the largest Islamist political party, for violating the constitution, thereby banning it from participating in elections. However, the ban was not enforced in practice.

Religious studies are compulsory and part of the curriculum in all government schools. Students attend classes in which their own religious beliefs are taught. Schools with few students from minority religious groups are generally allowed to make arrangements with local churches or temples to hold religious studies classes outside of school hours.

Persecution of religious minorities

Hindus 

Hindus in Bangladesh have faced violence throughout the country's history, having been subjected to what most academics consider to be a genocide during the Bangladesh Liberation War in 1971. There have been more recent instances of violence in the 2010s.

In 2016 violence over blasphemy accusations lead to the destruction of 15 Hindu temples and 100 homes, although authorities suggest only 8 temples and 22 houses were damaged. According to a report by the Bangladesh Jatiya Hindu Mohajote, in 2017 alone, at least 107 people of the Hindu community were killed and 31 fell victims to enforced disappearances, while 782 Hindus were either forced to leave the country or faced threats demanding that they leave. A further 23 were forced to convert. At least 25 Hindu women and children were raped, while 235 temples and statues vandalized during the year. According to the BJHM, the total number of distinct "atrocities" that affected the Hindu community in 2017 is 6474. During the 2019 Bangladesh elections, eight houses belonging to Hindu families on fire in Thakurgaon District alone.

Chakma people 
In June 2017, hundreds of Bengali Muslim villagers in the southeastern part of the country set fire to 300 houses belonging to members of the Chakma people, a mostly Buddhist minority. A 70-year-old woman died during the attacks. The arson followed the killing of a local Muslim resident.

Christians 
In 2018, Bangladesh was number 41 on the World Watch List for religious persecution of Christians, between the United Arab Emirates and Algeria. In 2016, four people were murdered for their Christian faith. The growing Christian population is met by growing persecution.

Ahmadiyya 
Ahmadis have been targeted by various protests and acts of violence, and fundamentalist Islamic groups have demanded that Ahmadis be officially declared kafirs (infidels).

Atheists 
Several Bangladeshi atheists have been assassinated, and a "hit list" exists issued by the Bangladeshi Islamic organisation, the Ansarullah Bangla Team. Activist atheist bloggers have left Bangladesh under threat of assassination.

Bhutan 

The Bhutanese Constitution of 2008 and previous law provide for freedom of religion in Bhutan; however, the government has limited non-Buddhist missionary activity, barring non-Buddhist missionaries from entering the country, limiting construction of non-Buddhist religious buildings, and restricting the celebration of some non-Buddhist religious festivals. Drukpa Kagyu (Mahayana) Buddhism is the state religion, although in the southern areas many citizens openly practice Hinduism, and there is an increasing acceptance of Hinduism as a religion in Bhutan, including support from the royal family of Bhutan.

There are reports of discrimination against Christians in the country, who are forced to practice their religion in private (or to cross the border into India to hold public services). According to a Christian religious leader, Christian children are sometimes denied access to schools.

Religious political parties are forbidden by the constitution of Bhutan.

Brunei 

The constitution of Brunei states, "The religion of Brunei Darussalam shall be the Muslim religion according to the Shafi'i sect of that religion: Provided that all other religions may be practiced in peace and harmony by the person professing them in any part of Brunei Darussalam." However, the government imposes many restrictions on non-Shafi'i and non-Islamic religious practice.

Since the early 1990s, the government has reinforced the legitimacy of the hereditary monarchy and the observance of traditional and Muslim values by asserting a national ideology known as the Melayu Islam Beraja (MIB), or Malay Islamic Monarchy, the genesis of which reportedly dates from the 15th century. MIB principles have been adopted as the basis for government, and all meetings and ceremonies commence with a Muslim prayer. At citizenship ceremonies non-Muslims must wear national dress, which includes Muslim head coverings for men and women. There is no legal requirement for women to wear head coverings in public, and government officials are portrayed regularly, if infrequently, in the media without head coverings. There is social pressure for women to wear head coverings in public.

Law enforcement 
The government routinely censors magazine articles on other faiths, blacking out or removing photographs of crucifixes and other Christian religious symbols. Government officials also guard against the distribution and sale of items that feature photographs of undesirable or religious symbols. There have been reports that agents of the Internal Security Department monitored religious services at Christian churches and that senior church members believed that they were under intermittent surveillance.

Religious authorities regularly participated in raids to confiscate alcoholic beverages and non-halal meats. They also monitored restaurants and supermarkets to ensure conformity with halal practice. Restaurants and service employees that served a Muslim in daylight hours during the fasting month were subjected to fines. Non-halal restaurants and non-halal sections in supermarkets were allowed to operate without interference from religious authorities.

Education 
The Ministry of Education requires courses on Islam and the MIB in all public schools. Private schools are not required to teach Islam, but many make voluntary Ugama instruction available on an extracurricular, after-hours basis. Ugama is a six-year education system that teaches Islam under the Sunni Shafi'i school of thought. Most school textbooks were illustrated to depict Islam as the norm, and often all women and girls were shown wearing the Muslim head covering. There were no depictions of practices of other religions in textbooks. The Ministry prohibits the teaching of other religions and comparative religious studies. At one private school that offers Islam instruction during regular school hours, Christian students have been allowed to attend church during those periods when Muslim students receive instruction about Islam.

Marriage and conversions 
Marriage between Muslims and those of other faiths is not permitted, and non-Muslims must convert to Islam if they wish to marry a Muslim. Muslims who wish to convert to another religion face such official and societal pressure not to leave Islam that conversion is extremely difficult if not impossible in practice. Permission from the Ministry of Religious Affairs must be obtained to convert from Islam.

Cambodia

Article 43 of the Constitution of the Kingdom of Cambodia reads: "Khmer citizens of either sex shall have the right to freedom of belief. Freedom of religious belief and worship shall be guaranteed by the State on the condition that such freedom does not affect other religious beliefs or violate public order and security. Buddhism shall be the State religion."

China

The Constitution of the People's Republic of China provides for freedom of religious belief; however, the government restricts religious practice to government-sanctioned organizations and registered places of worship and controls the growth and scope of the activity of religious groups. The government of China currently recognizes five religious groups: the Buddhist Association of China, the Chinese Taoist Association, the Islamic Association of China, the Three-Self Patriotic Movement (a Protestant group), and the Chinese Patriotic Catholic Association.

Members of the governing Communist Party are strongly discouraged from holding religious faith.

A significant number of non-sanctioned churches and temples exist, attended by locals and foreigners alike. Unregistered or underground churches are not officially banned, but are not permitted to openly conduct religious services. These bodies may face varying degrees of interference, harassment, and persecution by state and party organs. In some instances, unregistered religious believers and leaders have been charged with "illegal religious activities" or "disrupting social stability." Religious believers have also been charged under article 300 of the criminal code, which forbids using heretical organizations to "undermine the implementation of the law."

Falun Gong 
Following a period of meteoric growth of Falun Gong in the 1990s, the Communist Party launched a campaign to "eradicate" Falun Gong on 20 July 1999. The suppression is characterised by multifaceted propaganda campaign, a program of enforced ideological conversion and re-education, and a variety of extralegal coercive measures such as arbitrary arrests, forced labor, and physical torture, sometimes resulting in death.

An extra-constitutional body called the 6-10 Office was created to lead the suppression of Falun Gong. The authorities mobilized the state media apparatus, judiciary, police, army, the education system, families and workplaces against the group. The campaign is driven by large-scale propaganda through television, newspaper, radio and internet. There are reports of systematic torture, illegal imprisonment, forced labor, organ harvesting and abusive psychiatric measures, with the apparent aim of forcing practitioners to recant their belief in Falun Gong.

Tibetan Buddhism 
Prior to Tibet's incorporation into China, Tibet was a theocracy with the Dalai Lama functioning as the head of government. Since incorporation into China, Dalai Lama have at times sanctioned Chinese control of the territory, while at other times they have been a focal point of political and spiritual opposition to the Chinese government. As various high-ranking Lamas in the country have died, the Chinese government has proposed their own candidates for these positions, which has led at times to rival claimants to the same position. In an effort to further control Tibetan Buddhism and thus Tibet, the Chinese government passed a law in 2007 requiring a Reincarnation Application be completed and approved for all lamas wishing to reincarnate.

Treatment of Muslims 
Ethnicity plays a large role in the Chinese government's attitude toward Muslim worship. Authorities in Xinjiang impose strict restrictions on Uyghur Muslims: mosques are monitored by the government, Ramadan observance is restricted, and the government has run campaigns to discourage men from growing beards which are associated with fundamentalist Islam. Individual Uyghur Muslims have been detained for practicing their religion. However, this persecution is largely due to the association of Islam with Uyghur separatism. Hui Muslims living in China do not face the same degree of persecution, and the government has at times been particularly lenient toward Hui practitioners. Although religious education for children is officially forbidden by law in China, the Communist party allows Hui Muslims to violate this law and have their children educated in religion and attend Mosques while the law is enforced on Uyghurs. After secondary education is completed, China then allows Hui students who are willing to embark on religious studies under an Imam. China does not enforce the law against children attending Mosques on non-Uyghurs in areas outside of Xinjiang.

Support for traditional religions 
Toward the end of the 20th century, China's government began to more openly encourage the practice of various traditional cults, particularly the state cults devoted to the Yellow Emperor and the Red Emperor. In the early 2000s, the Chinese government became open especially to traditional religions such as Mahayana Buddhism, Taoism and folk religion, emphasising the role of religion in building a "Harmonious Society" (hexie shehui), a Confucian idea. Aligning with Chinese anthropologists' emphasis on "religious culture", the government considers these religions as integral expressions of national "Chinese culture" and part of China's intangible cultural heritage.

Cyprus

The Republic of Cyprus largely upholds and respects religious freedom within its territory. However, individual cases of religious discrimination against Muslims have occurred. In 2016, a 19th-century mosque was attacked by arsonists, an action condemned by the government.

In 2018, the Cyprus Humanist Association accused the Ministry of Education of promoting anti-atheist educational content on its government website.

Northern Cyprus 

While freedom of religion is constitutionally protected in Turkish occupied Northern Cyprus, the government has at times restricted the practice of Greek Orthodox Churches. A controversial 2016 decision restricts most Orthodox churches to celebrate a single religious service per year.

East Timor 

The constitution of East Timor establishes the freedom of religion, and specifies that there is no state religion and that religious entities are separate from the state. Nevertheless, the constitution commends the Catholic Church for its role in securing the country's independence, and a concordat with the Holy See grants the Catholic Church certain privileges. The government routinely provides funding to the Catholic Church, and other religious organizations may apply for funding.

Religious organizations are not required to register with the government, and can apply for tax-exemption status from the Ministry of Finance. Should an organization wish to run private schools or provide other community services, registration with the Ministry of Justice is required.

Religious leaders have reported incidents where individual public servants have denied service to members of religious minorities, but do not consider this to be a systematic problem. The government has, however, routinely rejected birth and marriage certificates from religious organizations other than the Catholic Church. Civil certificates are the only option that religious minorities have for government recognition of marriages and births.

Representatives of the Catholic, Protestant, and Muslim communities in East Timor maintain good relations with each other.

India

The Indian constitution's preamble states that India is a secular state. Freedom of religion is a fundamental right guaranteed by the constitution. According to Article 25 of the Indian Constitution, every citizen of India has the right to "profess, practice and propagate religion", "subject to public order, morality and health" and also subject to other provisions under that article.

Article 25 (2b) uses the term "Hindus" for all classes and sections of Hindus, Jains, Buddhists and Sikhs. Sikhs and Buddhists objected to this wording that makes many Hindu personal laws applicable to them. However, the same article also guarantees the right of members of the Sikh faith to bear a Kirpan.

Religions require no registration. The government can ban a religious organisation if it disrupts communal harmony, has been involved in terrorism or sedition, or has violated the Foreign Contributions Act. The government limits the entry of any foreign religious institution or missionary and since the 1960s, no new foreign missionaries have been accepted though long term established ones may renew their visas. Many sections of the law prohibit hate speech and provide penalties for writings, illustrations, or speech that insult a particular community or religion.

Some major religious holidays like Diwali (Hindu), Christmas (Christian), Eid (Muslim) and Guru Nanak's birth anniversary (Sikh) are considered national holidays. Private schools offering religious instruction are permitted while government schools are non-religious.

The government has set up the Ministry of Minority Affairs, the National Human Rights Commission (NHRC) and the National Commission for Minorities (NCM) to investigate religious discrimination and to make recommendations for redressal to the local authorities. Though they do not have any power, local and central authorities generally follow them. These organisations have investigated numerous instances of religious tension including the implementation of "anti-conversion" bills in numerous states, the 2002 Gujarat violence against Muslims, The Exodus of Kashmiri Hindus from the state (now a union territory since August 5, 2019) of Jammu and Kashmir in the 1990s and the 2008 attacks against Christians in Orissa.

Jammu and Kashmir 
The Grand Ashura Procession In Kashmir where Shia Muslims mourn the death of Husayn ibn Ali has been banned by the Government of Jammu and Kashmir since the 1990s. People taking part in it are detained, and injured by Jammu and Kashmir Police every year. According to the government, this restriction was placed due to security reasons. Local religious authorities and separatist groups condemned this action and said it is a violation of their fundamental religious rights.

Indonesia

The Indonesian Constitution states "every person shall be free to choose and to practice the religion of his/her choice" and "guarantees all persons the freedom of worship, each according to his/her own religion or belief". It also states that "the nation is based upon belief in one supreme God." The first tenet of the country's national ideology, Pancasila, similarly declares belief in one God. Government employees are required to swear allegiance to the nation and to the Pancasila ideology. While there are no official laws against atheism, a lack of religious belief is contrary to the first tenet of Pancasila, and atheists have been charged and prosecuted for blasphemy.

The government officially only recognises six religions, namely Islam, Protestantism, Catholicism, Hinduism, Buddhism and Confucianism.

Iran

The Iranian constitution was drafted during the Iranian Constitutional Revolution in 1906; While the constitution was modelled on Belgium's 1831 constitution, the provisions guaranteeing freedom of worship were omitted.  Subsequent legislation provided some recognition to the religious minorities of Zoroastrians, Jews and Christians, in addition to majority Muslim population, as equal citizens under state law, but it did not guarantee freedom of religion and "gave unprecedented institutional powers to the clerical establishment." The Islamic Republic of Iran, that was established after the Iranian revolution, recognizes four religions, whose status is formally protected: Zoroastrianism, Judaism, Christianity, and Islam. Members of the first three groups receive special treatment under law, and five of the 270 seats in parliament are reserved for members of these religious groups. However, senior government posts including the presidency are reserved exclusively for followers of Shia Islam.

Additionally, adherents of the Baháʼí Faith, Iran's largest religious minority, are not recognized and are targeted for persecution. Baháʼís have been subjected to unwarranted arrests, false imprisonment, executions, confiscation and destruction of property owned by individuals and the Baháʼí community, denial of civil rights and liberties, and denial of access to higher education. Since the Islamic Revolution of 1979, Iranian Baháʼís have regularly had their homes ransacked or been banned from attending university or holding government jobs, and several hundred have received prison sentences for their religious beliefs. Baháʼí cemeteries have been desecrated and property seized and occasionally demolished, including the House of Mírzá Buzurg, Bahá'u'lláh's father. The House of the Báb in Shiraz has been destroyed twice, and is one of three sites to which Baháʼís perform pilgrimage.

Iraq

The government of Iraq is a constitutional democracy with a republican, federal, pluralistic governmental system consisting of 18 provinces or "governorates.". Although the Constitution recognizes Islam as the official religion and states that no law may be enacted that contradicts the established provisions of Islam, it also guarantees freedom of thought, conscience, and religious belief and practice.

While the Government generally endorses these rights, political instability during the Iraq War and the 2014—2017 Iraqi Civil War and the prevented effective governance in parts of the country not controlled by the Government, and the Government's ability to protect religious freedoms has been handicapped by insurgency, terrorism, and sectarian violence. Since 2003, when the government of Saddam Hussein fell, the Iraqi government has generally not engaged in state-sponsored persecution of any religious group, calling instead for tolerance and acceptance of all religious minorities. However, some government institutions have continued their long-standing discriminatory practices against the Baháʼí and Sunni Muslims.

Beginning in 2017, an Iraqi insurgency by the Islamic State of Iraq and the Levant (IS, formerly ISIL or ISIS) led to violations of religious freedom in certain parts of Iraq. IS is a Sunni jihadist group that claims religious authority over all Muslims across the world and aspires to bring most of the Muslim-inhabited regions of the world under its political control beginning with Iraq. The IS follows an extreme anti-Western interpretation of Islam, promotes religious violence and regards those who do not agree with its interpretations as infidels or apostates. Concurrently, IS aims to establish a Salafist-orientated Islamist state in Iraq, Syria and other parts of the Levant.

Israel

Israel's Basic Law of Human Dignity and Liberty promises freedom and full social and political equality, regardless of political affiliation, while also describing the country as a "Jewish and democratic state". However, the Pew Research Center has identified Israel as one of the countries that places high restrictions on religion, and the U.S. State Department notes that while the government generally respects religious freedom in practice, governmental and legal discrimination against non-Jews and non-Orthodox Jews exist, including arrests, detentions, and the preferential funding of Jewish schools and religious organizations over similar organizations serving other religious groups. On July 18, 2018, Israel adopted a law defining itself as "the homeland of the Jewish people in which the Jewish people fulfill their self-determination according to their cultural and historical legacy."

Various observers have objected that archaeological and construction practices funded by the Israeli government are used to bolster Jewish claims to the land while ignoring other sites of archaeological importance, some going as far as to claim that Israel systematically disrespected sites of Christian and Muslim cultural and historical importance.

Several influential political parties within Israel's Knesset have explicitly religious character and politics (Shas, The Jewish Home, United Torah Judaism). Shas and United Torah Judaism represent different ethnic subgroups of the Haredi Jewish community in Israel. These parties seek to strengthen Jewish religious laws in the country and enforce more ultra-orthodox customs on the rest of the population, among other political platforms specific to their voterbase. Historically the state's treatment of Haredi Jewish communities has been an issue of political contention, and different Haredi communities are divided on their attitude toward the Israeli state itself. The Jewish Home represents the religious right-wing Israeli settler communities in the West Bank.

While Israel's legal tradition is based on English Common Law, not Jewish Halakha, Halakha is applied in many civil matters, such as laws relating to marriage and divorce, and legal rulings concerning the Temple Mount. Israeli authorities have codified a number of religious laws in the country's political laws, including an official ban on commerce on Shabbat and a 1998 ban on the importation of nonkosher meat.

Law of Return 
The Israeli Law of Return provides that any Jew, or the child or grandchild of a Jew, may immigrate to Israel with their spouse and children. Israel's process for determining the validity of a prospective immigrant's claim to Judaism has changed over time, and has been subject to various controversies.

Management of holy sites 
Israel's 1967 Protection of Holy Sites Law protects the holy sites of all religious groups in the country. The government also provides for the maintenance and upkeep of holy sites, although The U.S. State Department has noted that Jewish sites receive considerably more funding than Muslim sites, and that the government additionally provides for the construction of new Jewish synagogues and cemeteries.

Temple Mount / Haram al-Sharif / Al-Aqsa Mosque compound 
The government of Israel has repeatedly upheld a policy of not allowing non-Muslims to pray at the Temple Mount/Haram al-Sharif  since their annexation of East Jerusalem and the Temple Mount/Haram al-Sharif site in 1967. The government has ruled to allow access to the compound for individuals regardless of faith, but removes non-Muslims if they appear to be praying and sometimes restricts access for non-Muslims and young Muslim men, citing security concerns. Since 2000, the Jerusalem Islamic Waqf that manages the Al-Aqsa Mosque compound has restricted non-Muslims from entering the Dome of the Rock shrine and Jami'a Al-Aqsa, and prohibits wearing or displaying non-Muslim religious symbols.

Western Wall 
The religious practices allowed at the Western Wall are established by the Rabbi of the Western Wall, appointed jointly by the Prime Minister of Israel and chief rabbis. Mixed-gender prayer is forbidden at the Western Wall, in deference to Orthodox Jewish practice. Women are not allowed to wear certain prayer shawls, and are not allowed to read aloud from the Torah at the Wall.

Japan

Historically, Japan had a long tradition of mixed religious practice between Shinto and Buddhism since the introduction of Buddhism in the 7th century. Though the Emperor of Japan is supposed to be the direct descendant of Amaterasu Ōmikami, the Shinto sun goddess, all Imperial family members, as well as almost all Japanese, were Buddhists who also practiced Shinto religious rites as well. Christianity flourished when it was first introduced by Francis Xavier, but was soon violently suppressed.

After the Meiji Restoration, Japan tried to reform its state to resemble a European constitutional monarchy. The Emperor,  Buddhism, and Shintoism were officially separated and Shintoism was set as the state religion. The Constitution specifically stated that Emperor is "holy and inviolable". During the period of Hirohito, the status of emperor was further elevated to be a living god. This ceased at the end of World War II, when the current constitution was drafted. (See Ningen-sengen.)

In 1946, during the Occupation of Japan, the United States drafted Article 20 of the constitution of Japan (still in use), which mandates a separation of religious organizations from the state, as well as ensuring religious freedom: "No religious organization shall receive any privileges from the State, nor exercise any political authority. No person shall be compelled to take part in any religious act, celebration, rite or practice. The State and its organs shall refrain from religious education or any other religious activity."

The New Komeito Party is a political party associated with the religion Sōka Gakkai, a minor religion in Japan.

Jordan

The Constitution of Jordan provides for the freedom to practice the rights of one's religion and faith in accordance with the customs that are observed in the kingdom, unless they violate public order or morality. The state religion is Islam. The Government prohibits conversion from Islam and proselytizing to Muslims.

Members of unrecognized religious groups and converts from Islam face legal discrimination and bureaucratic difficulties in personal status cases. Converts from Islam additionally risk the loss of civil rights. Shari'a courts have the authority to prosecute proselytizers.

Relations between Muslims and Christians generally are good; however, adherents of unrecognized religions and Muslims who convert to other faiths face societal discrimination. Prominent societal leaders have taken steps to promote religious freedom.

Kazakhstan

Kazakhstan has a long tradition of secularism and tolerance. In particular, Muslim, Russian Orthodox, Roman Catholic, and Jewish leaders all reported high levels of acceptance in society. The Constitution of Kazakhstan provides for freedom of religion, and the various religious communities worship largely without government interference. However, local officials attempt on occasion to limit the practice of religion by some nontraditional groups, and higher-level officials or courts occasionally intervene to correct such attempts.

, the law on religion continues to impose mandatory registration requirements on missionaries and religious organizations. Most religious groups, including those of minority and nontraditional denominations, reported that the religion laws did not materially affect religious activities. In 2007, the Hare Krishna movement, a registered group, suffered the demolition of 25 homes as part of the Karasai local government's campaign to seize title to its land based on alleged violations of property laws.

North Korea

The North Korean constitution guarantees freedom of belief; however, the US Department of State International Religious Freedom Report for 2011 claims that "Genuine religious freedom does not exist."

While many Christians in North Korea fled to the South during the Korean War, and former North Korean president Kim Il-sung criticized religion in his writings, it is unclear the extent to which religious persecution was enacted, as narratives about persecution faced by Christians are complicated by evidence of pro-Communist Christian communities that may have existed since at least the 1960s, and that many Christian defectors from North Korea were also of a high socioeconomic class and thus would have had other reasons to oppose and face persecution from the government. The Federation of Korean Christians and Korea Buddhist Federation are the official representatives of those faith groups in government, but it is unclear to what extent they are actually representative of religious practitioners in the country.

South Korea

According to the US Department of State, the constitution provides for freedom of religion, and the government generally respected this right in practice.

In the Pew Research Center's Government Restrictions Index 2015, the country was categorized as having moderate levels of government restrictions on the freedom of religion, up from previous categorizations of low levels of government restrictions.

Since the 1980s and the 1990s there have been acts of hostility committed by Protestants against Buddhists and followers of traditional religions in South Korea. This include the arson of temples, the beheading of statues of Buddha and bodhisattvas, and red Christian crosses painted on either statues or other Buddhist and other religions' properties. Some of these acts have even been promoted by churches' pastors.

In 2018, a mass protest broke out in support of freedom of religion and against the government's inaction on widespread programs of violent forced conversion carried out by Christian churches under the guide of the Christian Council of Korea (CCK), just after a woman named Ji-In Gu, one among approximately a thousand victims of the churches, was kidnapped and killed while being forced to convert. Before being killed, Ji-In Gu dedicated herself in exposing the conversion treatments, and for such reason she had become a target of the Christian churches. Ji was a member of the controversial Shincheonji Church of Jesus the Temple of the Tabernacle of the Testimony, which is considered by most South Koreans to be a deceptive cult.

Kuwait 

The constitution of Kuwait provides for religious freedom, although it also establishes Islam as the state religion. While there is generally societal tolerance for Abrahamic religions, the laws of Kuwait consistently favor Islam. Shia Muslims face some discrimination as a consequence of government policies.

Restrictions and safeguards 
The law requires jail terms for journalists convicted of defaming any religion and prohibits denigration of Islam, Jewish, and Christian religious figures, including Muhammad and Jesus. The law prohibits publications that the government deems could create hatred, spread dissension among the public, or incite persons to commit crimes. The law prohibits non-Muslims from proselytizing. In accordance with the religious laws of Islam, it is illegal to import pork or alcohol, and public consumption of food is forbidden during Ramadan.

The government exercised direct control of Sunni religious institutions. The government appointed Sunni imams, monitored their Friday sermons, and financed construction of Sunni mosques. In some instances, Sunni imams were suspended for delivering sermons whose content the government deemed inflammatory. The government did not exert this control over Shia mosques, which the Shia community, not the government, funded.

Education 
The government has Islamic religion studies in public schools for all students. Non-Muslim students are not required to attend these classes. High school Islamic education textbooks are based largely on the Sunni interpretation of Islam.

Marriage and family law 
Religious courts administer personal status law. Shia Muslims follow their own jurisprudence in matters of personal status and family law at the first instance and appellate levels. In 2003 the government approved a Shia request to establish a court of cassation to oversee Shia personal status issues, but as of 2017 the court has not yet been established due to the lack of Shia clergy in the country properly trained to officiate it.

The law states that Muslim apostates lose certain legal rights, including the right to inherit property from Muslim relatives or spouses, but it does not specify any criminal penalty. The marriage of a Muslim man is annulled if he converts from Islam. A Muslim woman may have her marriage annulled if her Muslim husband converts to another religion.

The law prohibits the naturalization of non-Muslims but allows male citizens of any religion to transmit citizenship to their descendants. The law forbids marriage between Muslim women and non-Muslim men, but Muslim men may marry women of other Abrahamic faiths. The law requires that children of such marriages be raised in their father's faith, and the father's religion governs the settlement of marital disputes. he government does not designate religion on passports or national identity documents, with the exception of birth certificates. On birth certificates issued to Muslims, the government does not differentiate between Sunnis and Shia.

Treatment of Shia Muslims 
Shia worshipers gathered peacefully in public spaces to attend sermons and eulogies during Ashura and the government provided security to Shia neighborhoods. However, the government did not permit self-flagellation (public reenactments) of the martyrdom of Hussein.

Even though the Shia make up an estimated 30 percent of the population, they remained underrepresented in all segments of government: six of 50 members in parliament, one of 16 cabinet members, one of six Amiri Diwan advisors, and disproportionately lower numbers of senior officers in the military and police force. Shia community leaders repeatedly complained about a glass ceiling in promotions and difficulties in getting jobs, as well as the lack of new places to worship, which they said created an oppressive environment for their community.

Treatment of followers non-Abrahamic religions 
Members of non-Abrahamic faiths stated that they remained free to practice their religion in private, but faced harassment and potential prosecution if they practiced their faith in public. Expatriates of non-Abrahamic religions could not have public places of worship nor marry in Kuwait, and they remained subject to sharia if family matters were taken to court. Most members of these communities indicated they were able to practice their faith within their communities, but practiced a discreet form of self-censorship that allowed them to avoid conflict with authorities.

Kyrgyzstan

The Constitution of Kyrgyzstan provides for the freedom of religion in Kyrgyzstan, and the government generally respects this right in practice. However, the Government restricts the activities of radical Islamic groups that it considered threats to stability and security and hampered or refused the registration of some Christian churches. The Constitution provides for the separation of religion and state, and it prohibits discrimination based on religion or religious beliefs. The Government does not officially support any religion; however, a May 6, 2006 decree recognized Islam (practiced by 88% of the population) and Russian Orthodoxy (practiced by 9.4% of the population) as traditional religious groups.

The State Agency for Religious Affairs (SARA), formerly called the State Commission on Religious Affairs (SCRA), is responsible for promoting religious tolerance, protecting freedom of conscience, and overseeing laws on religion. All religious organizations, including schools, must apply for approval of registration from SARA. The Muftiate (or Spiritual Administration of Muslims of Kyrgyzstan-SAMK) is the highest Islamic managing body in the country. The Muftiate oversees all Islamic entities, including institutes and madrassahs, mosques, and Islamic organizations.

Although most religious groups and sects operated with little interference from the Government or each other, there have been several cases of societal abuse based on religious beliefs and practices. Muslims who attempt to convert to other religions face heavy censure and persecution. In one case, a mob upset at a Baptist pastor's conversions of Muslims to Christianity publicly beat the pastor and burned his Bibles and religious literature.

Laos

The Constitution of Laos provides for freedom of religion, some incidents of the persecution of Protestants have been reported. The Lao Front for National Construction (LFNC), a popular front organization for the Lao People's Revolutionary Party (LPRP), is responsible for the oversight of religious practice. The Prime Minister's Decree on Religious Practice (Decree 92) was the principal legal document defining rules for religious practice.

Local officials have pressured minority Protestants to renounce their faith on threat of arrest or forceful eviction from their villages. Such cases occurred in Bolikhamsai, Houaphanh Province, and Luang Namtha provinces. Arrests and detentions of Protestants occurred in Luang Namtha, Oudomxay, Salavan, Savannakhet, and Vientiane provinces. Two Buddhist monks were arrested in Bolikhamsai Province for having been ordained without government authorization. In some areas, minority Protestants were forbidden from gathering to worship. In areas where Protestants were actively proselytizing, local officials sometimes subjected them to "reeducation."

Conflicts between ethnic groups and movement among villages sometimes exacerbated religious tensions. The efforts of some Protestant congregations to establish churches independent of the Lao Evangelical Church (LEC) continued to cause strains within the Protestant community.

Lebanon

The Constitution of Lebanon provides for freedom of religion and the freedom to practice all religious rites provided that the public order is not disturbed. The Constitution declares equality of rights and duties for all citizens without discrimination or preference but establishes a balance of power among the major religious groups through a confessionalist system, largely codified by the National Pact. Family matters such as marriage, divorce and inheritance are still handled by the religious authorities representing a person's faith. Calls for civil marriage are unanimously rejected by the religious authorities but civil marriages conducted in another country are recognized by Lebanese civil authorities.

National Pact 

The National Pact is an agreement that specifies that specific government positions must go to members of specific religious groups, splitting power between the Maronite Christians, Greek Orthodox Christians, Sunni Muslims, Shia Muslims, and Druze, as well as stipulating some positions for the country's foreign policy. The first version of the pact, established in 1943, gave Christians a guaranteed majority in Parliament, reflecting the population of the country at the time, and specified that the highest office, the President of Lebanon, must be held by a Maronite Christian. Over the following decades, sectarian unrest would increase due to dissatisfaction with the greater power given to the Christian population and the refusal of the government to take another census that would provide the basis for a renegotiation of the National Pact eventually led to the Lebanese Civil War in 1975. The National Pact was renegotiated as part of the Taif Agreement to end the civil war, with the new conditions guaranteeing parliamentary parity between Muslim and Christian populations and reducing the power of the position of the Maronite President of Lebanon relative to the Sunni Prime Minister of Lebanon.

Malaysia

The status of religious freedom in Malaysia is a controversial issue. Islam is the official state religion and the Constitution of Malaysia provides for limited freedom of religion, notably placing control upon proselytization of religions other than Islam to Muslims. Non-Muslims who wish to marry Muslims and have their marriage recognized by the government must convert to Islam. However, questions including whether Malays can convert from Islam and whether Malaysia is an Islamic state or secular state remains unresolved. For the most part the multiple religions within Malaysia interact peacefully and exhibit mutual respect. This is evident by the continued peaceful co-existence of cultures and ethnic groups, although sporadic incidences of violence against Hindu temples, Muslim prayer halls, and Christian churches have occurred as recently as 2010.

Restrictions on religious freedom are also in place for Muslims who belong to denominations of Islam other than Sunni Islam, such as Shia Muslims and Ahmaddiya Muslims.

Illegal words in Penang state 
In 2010, a mufti in Penang decreed a fatwa that would forbid non-Muslims to use of 40 words related to Muslim religious practice. Under the Penang Islamic Religious Administration Enactment of 2004, a mufti in Penang state could propose fatwa that would be enforceable by law. The list included words such as "Allah", "Imam", "Sheikh", and "Fatwa", and purported to also make illegal the use of translations of these words into other languages. This decree caused uproar, particularly in the Sikh community, as Sikh religious texts use the term "Allah", with members of the community calling the law unconstitutional. The ban was overturned in 2014, as Penang lawmakers decreed that the Penang Islamic Religious Administration Enactment law only gave the Mufti permission to pass fatwas for the Muslim community, and that these bans were not enforceable on non-Muslim individuals.

Maldives 

The constitution of Maldives designates Islam as the state religion, requires citizens of Maldives to be Muslim, and requires public office holders, including the president, to be followers of Sunni Islam. The constitution provides for limitations on rights and freedoms “to protect and maintain the tenets of Islam.” Propagation of any religion other than Islam is a criminal offense. The law criminalizes speech breaking Islamic tenets, breaching social norms, or threatening national security. Antiterror legislation bans the promotion of “unlawful” religious ideologies. The penal code permits the administration of certain Sharia punishments, such as stoning and amputation of hands, although such punishments are rarely used in sentencing.

The Ministry of Islamic Affairs (MIA) maintains control over all matters pertaining to religion, and oversees the content of sermons given by imams at Friday services, as well as enforcing strict rules on who is allowed to legally preach within the country.

The law prohibits importation of any items deemed contrary to Islam by the MIA, including religious literature, religious statues, alcohol, pork products, and pornographic materials. Foreigners visiting the country are not allowed to publicly display religious symbols for religions other than Islam.

The constitution states education shall strive to “inculcate obedience to Islam” and “instill love for Islam.” In accordance with the law, the MIA regulates Islamic instruction in schools, while the Ministry of Education funds salaries of religious instructors in schools.

Societal attitudes 
Religiously motivated violent extremists target individuals whom they label as "secularists" for harassment and violence, up to and including murder. Non-governmental organizations have reported that the government encourages this activity, and that the extremists have targeted employees of human rights organizations.

Incidents 
Following the killing of secular blogger Yameen Rasheed in 2017, the president Abdulla Yameen issued a statement that criticized "anti-Islamic" bloggers and condoned the killing, saying that "hate speech" could cause "certain elements" within society to "do anything to these people".

The government of Maldives has issued court summons to expatriates for posting "anti-Islamic" content online.

Mongolia

The Constitution of Mongolia provides for freedom of religion, and the Mongolian Government generally respects this right in practice; however, the law somewhat limits proselytism, and some religious groups have faced bureaucratic harassment or been denied registration. There have been few reports of societal abuses or discrimination based on religious belief or practice.

Myanmar (Burma)

Every year since 1999 the U.S. State Department has designated Myanmar as a country of particular concern with regard to religious freedom. Muslims, and particularly Muslims of the Rohingya ethnic group, face discrimination at the hands of the Buddhist majority, often with governmental indifference or even active encouragement.

Genocide of Rohingya Muslims 

The Rohingya people have been denied Burmese citizenship since the Burmese nationality law (1982 Citizenship Act) was enacted. The Government of Myanmar claims that the Rohingya are illegal immigrants who arrived during the British colonial era, and were originally Bengalis. The Rohingya that are allowed to stay in Myanmar are considered 'resident foreigners' and not citizens. They are not allowed to travel without official permission and were previously required to sign a commitment not to have more than two children, though the law was not strictly enforced. Many Rohingya children cannot have their birth registered, thus rendering them stateless from the moment they are born. In 1995, the Government of Myanmar responded to UNHCR's pressure by issuing basic identification cards, which does not mention the bearer's place of birth, to the Rohingya. Without proper identification and documents, the Rohingya people are officially stateless with no state protection and their movements are severely restricted. As a result, they are forced to live in squatter camps and slums.

Starting in late 2016, the Myanmar military forces and extremist Buddhists began a major crackdown on the Rohingya Muslims in the country's western region of Rakhine State. The crackdown was in response to attacks on border police camps by unidentified insurgents, and has resulted in wide-scale human rights violations at the hands of security forces, including extrajudicial killings, gang rapes, arsons, and other brutalities. Since 2016, the military and the local Buddhists have killed at least 10,000 Rohingya people, burned down and destroyed 354 Rohingya villages in Rakhine state, and looted many Rohingya houses. The United Nations has described the persecution as "a textbook example of ethnic cleansing". In late September 2017, a seven-member panel of the Permanent Peoples' Tribunal found the Myanmar military and the Myanmar authority guilty of the crime of genocide against the Rohingya and the Kachin minority groups. The Myanmar leader and State Counsellor Aung San Suu Kyi was criticized for her silence over the issue and for supporting the military actions. Subsequently, in November 2017, the governments of Bangladesh and Myanmar signed a deal to facilitate the return of Rohingya refugees to their native Rakhine state within two months, drawing a mixed response from international onlookers.

According to the United Nations reports, as of January 2018, nearly 690,000 Rohingya people had fled or had been driven out of Rakhine state who then took shelter in the neighboring Bangladesh as refugees.

Nepal

Nepal has been a secular state since the end of the Nepalese Civil War in 2006, and the Constitution of Nepal adopted in 2015 guarantees religious freedom to all people in Nepal. The Constitution also defines Nepal as a secular state that is neutral toward the religions present in the country. The Constitution also bans actions taken to convert people from one religion to another, as well as acts that disturb the religion of other people.

There have been sporadic incidents of violence against the country's Christian minority. In 2009 and 2015, Christian churches were bombed by anti-government Hindu nationalist groups such as the Nepal Defence Army.

Oman 

The Basic Law of Oman declares that Islam is the state religion, that Shari'a is the source of legislation, and that the Sultan of Oman must be a Muslim. It also prohibits discrimination based on religion and provides for the freedom to practice religious rites as long as doing so does not disrupt public order. The government generally respects this right, but within defined parameters that placed limitations on the right in practice.

Government practices 
Religious gatherings in locations other than government-approved houses of worship are forbidden, although this is not enforced in practice. Religious organizations seeking to import religious texts must request approval from the Ministry of Endowments and Religious Affairs (MERA).

Omani law prohibits the defamation of any religion. Public proselytization is also forbidden. The MERA monitors sermons to ensure that their content is politically acceptable to the government.

Civil courts adjudicate cases according to the nonsectarian civil code. The law states Shia Muslims may resolve family and personal status cases according to Shia jurisprudence outside the courts, and retain the right to transfer their cases to civil courts if they cannot find a resolution within the Shia religious tradition. The law allows non-Muslims to seek adjudication of matters pertaining to family or personal status under the religious laws of their faith or under civil law.

Citizens may sue the government for violations of their right to practice religious rites that do not disrupt public order; there are no known cases of anyone pursuing this course in court.

Education 
Islamic studies are mandatory for Muslim students in public schools from kindergarten through 12th grade. Non-Muslim students are exempt from this requirement if they notify school administrators they do not wish to attend such instruction. The classes take a historical perspective in comparing the evolution of Islamic religious thinking, and teachers are prohibited from proselytizing or favoring one Islamic group over another. Many private schools provide alternative religious studies courses.

Societal attitudes 
Conversion from Islam was reportedly viewed extremely negatively within the Muslim community.

In 2017, the Anti-Defamation League and Simon Wiesenthal Center reported separate occasions of an antisemitic cartoon and article published in the Alwatan newspaper.

Pakistan

Pakistan's penal code includes provisions that forbid blasphemy against any religion recognized by the government of Pakistan. Punishments are more severe for blasphemy against Islam: while acts insulting others' religion can carry a penalty of up to 10 years in prison and a fine, desecration of the Quran can carry a life sentence and insulting or otherwise defiling the name of Muhammad can carry a death sentence. The death sentence for blasphemy has never been implemented, however, 51 people charged under the blasphemy laws have been murdered by vigilantes before their trials could be completed.

The Pakistan government does not formally ban the public practice of the Ahmadi Muslim sect, but its practice is restricted severely by law. A 1974 constitutional amendment declared Ahmadis to be a non-Muslim minority because, according to the Government, they do not accept Muhammad as the last prophet of Islam. However, Ahmadis consider themselves to be Muslims and observe Islamic practices. In 1984, under Ordinance XX the government added Section 298(c) into the Penal Code, prohibiting Ahmadis from calling themselves Muslim or posing as Muslims; from referring to their faith as Islam; from preaching or propagating their faith; from inviting others to accept the Ahmadi faith; and from insulting the religious feelings of Muslims.

Palestinian territories

The West Bank 

In the West Bank, Israel and the Palestinian National Authority (PA) enforce varying aspects of religious freedom. The laws of both Israel and the Palestinian National Authority protect religious freedom, and generally enforce these protections in practice. The PA enforces the Palestinian Basic Law, which provides for the freedom of religion, belief, and practice within the territories it administers. It also holds that Islam is the official religion of the Palestinian Territories, and that legislation should be based on interpretations of Islamic Law. Six seats in the 132-member Palestinian Legislative Council are reserved for Christians, while no other religious guarantees or restrictions are enforced. The PA recognizes a Friday-Saturday weekend, but allows Christians to work on Saturday in exchange for a day off on Sunday. Heightened tensions exist between Jewish and non-Jewish residents of this territory, although relations between other religious groups are relatively cordial.

The Palestinian Authority provides funding for Muslim and Christian holy sites in the West Bank and has been noted to give preferential treatment to Muslim sites, while the Israeli Government funds Jewish sites. Matters of inheritance, marriage, and dowry are handled by religious courts of the appropriate religion for the people in question, with members of faiths unrecognized by the PA are often advised to go abroad to resolve their affairs. Religious education is mandatory for grades 1 through 6 in schools funded by the PA, with separate courses available for Muslims and Christians.

While it is not strictly a religious ban, Israeli policies restricting the freedom of movement of Palestinians throughout the West Bank and between the West Bank and Israel restrict the ability for Palestinians to visit certain religious sites, such as the Church of the Holy Sepulchre, the Masjid Al-Aqsa, and the Church of the Nativity. These restrictions are sometimes relaxed for portions of the population on specific holidays. Christian groups have complained that an extended visa application process for the West Bank has impeded their ability to operate there. Jews are routinely provided access to specific holy sites in territories under the control of the PA, and holy sites that are significant to both Jews and Muslims, such as the Cave of the Patriarchs, enforce restricted access to either group on different days, with Jews often facing less restricted access and lighter security screening.

Gaza Strip 
Despite nominally being a part of the territory administered by the Palestinian National Authority, the Gaza Strip has been de facto controlled by Hamas since the 2006 Palestinian civil skirmishes. Religious freedom in Gaza is curtailed by Hamas, which imposes a stricter interpretation of Islamic law and at times has broadcast explicitly anti-Jewish propaganda. Due to the blockade of the Gaza Strip, Muslim residents of Gaza are not allowed by the Israeli government to visit holy sites in Israel or the West Bank, and Christian clergy from outside Gaza are not allowed access to the region. However, some Christian residents of Gaza have been issued permits by Israel to enter Israel and the West Bank during Christmas to visit family and holy sites.

Hamas largely tolerates the Christian population of the Gaza Strip and does not force Christians to follow Islamic law. However, Christians at times face harassment, and there are concerns that Hamas does not sufficiently protect them from religiously motivated violence perpetrated by other groups in the Gaza Strip.

Philippines

The 1987 Constitution of the Philippines mandates a separation of church and state, significantly limiting the Catholic Church's influence in the country's politics.

The Moro people are a Muslim ethnoreligious minority in the Philippines that have historically fought insurgencies against the government of the Philippines (as well as against previous occupying powers, such as Spain, the United States, and Japan). They have faced discrimination from the country's Christian majority in the 21st century.

Qatar 

In Qatar, the constitution, as well as certain laws, provide for freedom of association, public assembly, and worship in accordance with the requirements of public order and morality. Notwithstanding this, the law prohibits proselytizing by non-Muslims and places some restrictions on public worship. Islam is the state religion.

Legal system and restrictions 
Both Muslims and non-Muslims are tried under the unified court system, incorporating both secular law and Shari'a (Islamic law). Convicted Muslims may earn a sentence reduction of a few months by memorizing the Qur'an. Litigants in civil cases may request the Shari'a courts to assume jurisdiction.

The law provides for a prison sentence of up to seven years for defaming, desecrating, or committing blasphemy against Islam, Christianity, or Judaism.

Religious groups are required to register with the government. Unregistered religious groups that engage in worship activities are illegal, and members of those groups are subject to deportation. However, this is rarely enforced, and non-registered religious groups have been able to worship in private without disruption.

Converting to another religion from Islam is considered apostasy and is technically a capital offense; however, since the country gained independence in 1971, there has been no recorded execution or other punishment for such an act.

The government regulates the publication, importation, and distribution of all religious books and materials. However, in practice, individuals and religious institutions are not prevented from importing holy books and other religious items for personal or congregational use. Non-Muslim religious symbols are not allowed to be displayed in public, but representatives of minority religious communities in Qatar reported that they were allowed to wear traditional religious garments.

The government discouraged Qatari citizens and residents from taking part in the Umra or annual Hajj due to the severing of relations between Qatar and Saudi Arabia.

Education 
Islamic instruction is compulsory for all students in state-sponsored schools. While there were no restrictions on non-Muslims providing private religious instruction for children, most foreign children attended secular private schools. Muslim children were allowed to go to secular and coeducational private schools.

Societal attitudes 
Media based in the country periodically published antisemitic material, usually in the form of cartoons.

Saudi Arabia

The Kingdom of Saudi Arabia is an Islamic theocratic absolute monarchy in which Islam is the official religion. Religious status (defined as "Muslim" or "Non-Muslim") is identified on government-issued identity cards, and non-Muslims face many restrictions, including bans on non-Muslim religious texts and the dismissal of their testimony in court. Officially, the government supports the rights of non-Muslims to practice their faith in private, but non-Muslim organizations claim that there is no clear definition of what constitutes public or private, and that this leaves them at risk for punishment, which can include lashes and deportation. The government of Saudi Arabia does not allow non-Muslim clergy to enter the country for the purpose of conducting services, which further restricts practice.

Members of the Shi’a minority are the subjects of officially sanctioned political and economic discrimination, although the faith is not entirely banned. Shi'a Muslims are barred from employment in the government, military, and oil industries. Ahmadiyya Muslims are officially barred from the country, although many Saudi residents and citizens practice the religion privately.

It is illegal for Muslims to convert or renounce their religion, which is nominally punishable by death. Death sentences have been mandated as recently as 2015, although the most recent execution performed in Saudi Arabia solely for apostasy charges was conducted in 1994. In 2014, the government of Saudi Arabia passed new regulations against terrorism that defined "calling for atheist thought in any form, or calling into question the fundamentals of the Islamic religion on which [Saudi Arabia] is based" as a form of terrorism.

The Saudi Mutaween (Arabic: مطوعين), or Committee for the Propagation of Virtue and the Prevention of Vice (i.e., the religious police) enforces an interpretation of Muslim religious law in public, employing both armed and unarmed officers.

Islamic religious education is mandatory in public schools at all levels. All public school children receive religious instruction that conforms with the official version of Islam. Non-Muslim students in private schools are not required to study Islam. Private religious schools are permitted for non-Muslims or for Muslims adhering to unofficial interpretations of Islam.

Singapore

The constitution provides for freedom of religion; however, other laws and policies restricted this right in some circumstances.

In 1972 the Singapore government de-registered and banned the activities of Jehovah's Witnesses in Singapore on the grounds that its members refuse to perform military service (which is obligatory for all male citizens), salute the flag, or swear oaths of allegiance to the state. Singapore has banned all written materials published by the International Bible Students Association and the Watchtower Bible and Tract Society, both publishing arms of the Jehovah's Witnesses. A person who possesses a prohibited publication can be fined up to $1500 (Singapore Dollars $2,000) and jailed up to 12 months for a first conviction.

Sri Lanka
The Constitution of Sri Lanka provides for the freedom of practice of all religions, while reserving a higher status for Buddhism. At times, local police and government officials appeared to be acting in concert with Buddhist nationalist organizations. In addition, in NGOs have alleged that government officials provided assistance, or at least tacitly supported the actions of societal groups targeting religious minorities.

Matters related to family law, e.g., divorce, child custody and inheritance are adjudicated under customary law of the applicable ethnic or religious group. For example, the minimum age of marriage for women is 18 years, except in the case of Muslims, who continued to follow their customary religious practices of girls attaining marrying age with the onset of puberty and men when they are financially capable of supporting a family.

During the Sri Lankan Civil War, conflict between Tamil separatists and the government of Sri Lanka at times resulted in violence against temples and other religious targets. However, the primary causes of the conflict were not religious.

Syria

The constitution of the Syrian Arab Republic guarantees freedom of religion. Syria has had two constitutions: one passed in 1973, and one in 2012 through a referendum. Opposition groups rejected the referendum; claiming that the vote was rigged. Political instability caused by the Syrian Civil War has deepened religious sectarianism within the country, as well as creating regions in the country where the official government does not have the ability to enforce its laws.

Syria has come under international condemnation over their alleged "anti-Semitic" state media, and for alleged "sectarianism towards Sunni Muslims". This is a claim that Damascus denies. While secular, Syria does mandate that all students go through religious education of the religion that their parents are/were.

The government enforces several measures against what it considers to be Islamic fundamentalism. The Muslim Brotherhood, a political Sunni Muslim organization, is banned in Syria, alongside other Muslim sects that the government considers to be Salafi or Islamist. Those accused of membership in any such organization can be sentenced to long prison terms. In 2010, the Syrian government banned the use of the niqab in universities.

Jehovah's Witnesses in Syria face persecution, as the government banned their religion in 1964 for being a "Zionist organization".

Democratic Federation of Northern Syria 
The charter of the Democratic Federation of Northern Syria (also known as Rojava) guarantees the freedom of religion to people living within its territory. The government of this region employs various measures to ensure the representation of various ethnic and religious groups in the government, using a system that has been compared to Lebanon's confessionalist system. However, there have been numerous claims made by refugees that YPG units affiliated with the Democratic Federation have forcibly displaced Sunni Arabs from their homes, in addition to destroying businesses and crops. These claims have been denied by Syrian Kurdish authorities.

Free Syrian Army 

Battalions affiliated with the Free Syrian Army have been accused of taking hostages and murdering members of religious minorities in territory held by their soldiers.

Jihadist groups 

Jihadist groups, such as the Islamic State of Iraq and the Levant and Jabhat Al-Nusra have enforced very strict interpretations of Sunni religious law in their territory, executing civilians for blasphemy, adultery, and other charges. Watchdog organizations have documented extensive persecution of Yazidi people, particularly women, who have been routinely forced into sexual slavery by the Islamic State in what Human Rights Watch described as an "organized system of rape and sexual assault".

Taiwan (Republic of China)

Article 13 of the Constitution of the Republic of China provides that the people shall have freedom of religious belief.

Tajikistan

Freedom of religion in Tajikistan is provided for in Tajikistan's constitution. Tajikistan's government enforces a policy of active secularism.

Tajikistan is unique for barring minors from attending public religious ceremonies, with the exception of funerals (where they must be accompanied by an adult guardian). Minors are allowed to practice religion in private. Hanafi mosques bar women from attending services, a policy decreed by a religious council with support from the government.

Tajikistan's policies reflect a concern about Islamic extremism, a concern shared by much of the general population. The government actively monitors the activities of religious institutions to keep them from becoming overtly political.  A Tajikistan Ministry of Education policy prohibited girls from wearing the hijab at public schools.

Thailand 

The constitution of Thailand prohibits discrimination based on religious belief and protects religious liberty, but also stipulates that the government should promote Theravada Buddhism and that the King of Thailand is required to be Buddhist. There is an ongoing insurgency in the southern part of the country, which is motivated by ethnic and religious separatism by Malay Muslims.

Legal framework 
The law officially recognizes five religious groups:  Buddhism, Islam, Brahman Hinduism, Sikhism, and Christianity, and does not confer recognition to any new groups outside of these umbrella categories. Unregistered groups are allowed to practice their religion without disruption, but are not eligible for tax-exemption status and other benefits of registration.

Laws prohibit the defamation of Buddhism or Buddhist clergy, punishable by fines.

The Central Islamic Council of Thailand, whose members are Muslims appointed by royal proclamation, advises the Ministries of Education and Interior on Islamic issues. The government provides funding for Islamic educational institutions, the construction of mosques, and participation in the Hajj. The chularatchamontri (grand mufti) is appointed by the king.

The Ministry of Justice allows the practice of sharia as a special legal process, outside of the national civil code, for Muslim residents of the South for family law, including inheritance. Provincial courts apply this law and a sharia expert advises the judge.

The constitution prohibits Buddhist clergy from voting in elections or running for seats in the House of Representatives or Senate. Christian clergy are prohibited from voting in elections if they are in formal religious dress. Except for the chularatchamontri himself, imams are not regarded as priests or clergy and are thus allowed to vote in elections and assume political positions.

Female Buddhist monks are not recognized by the government, and thus do not receive any of the privileges associated with monk status in the country.

Education 
Religious education is required for all students at both the primary and secondary levels; students may not opt out. The curriculum must contain information about all of the five recognized umbrella religious groups in the country. Students who wish to pursue in-depth studies of a particular religion may study at private religious schools and can transfer credits to public schools. Individual schools, working in conjunction with their local administrative boards, are authorized to arrange additional religious studies courses.

Insurgency 

Because of the close ties between ethnicity and religion in Thailand, violence that is part of the ongoing insurgency in South Thailand is difficult to classify as being purely motivated by religious identity. In 2017, there were at least 263 deaths reported connected to insurgent violence, and no reports of anyone being specifically targeted due to their religion.

Some Buddhist monks regarded as part of the Buddhist “nationalist” movement used social media to call for violence against Muslims. In 2017, Apichat Punnajanatho, a Buddhist monk, was arrested by the government for making anti-Islamic that encouraged violence, and was expelled from the monkhood.

There were no reports of Muslims calling for violence against Buddhists in Thailand in 2017. In prior years, insurgents would target some school teachers and Buddhist monks, whom they viewed as agents of the Thai government. As of 2017, this practice appears to have been discontinued. The primary rhetoric of the insurgency portrays the insurgency as opposition to "Siamese colonizers".

Other incidents 
According to human rights groups, a majority of the country's relatively small urban refugee and asylum seeker population are fleeing religious persecution elsewhere. Many of them, both those registered by the United Nations and others who were not, face prolonged detention in crowded immigration detention centers, some for years. Authorities reportedly arrest and detain some UN-designated refugees, some of whom claimed they faced religious persecution in their home countries. Those without asylum-seeking status face eventual deportation.

In October 2017, The Sangha Supreme Council issued an order prohibiting monks from using social media to criticize the kingdom, Buddhism, or the monarchy, or otherwise behaving in a manner inappropriate to their religious status.

Turkey

The Constitution of Turkey establishes the country as a secular state and provides for freedom of belief and worship and the private dissemination of religious ideas. However, other constitutional provisions for the integrity of the secular state restrict these rights. The constitution prohibits discrimination on religious grounds. Article 219 of the penal code prohibits imams, priests, rabbis and other religious leaders from "reproaching or vilifying" the government or the laws of the state while performing their duties, punishable by several months in prison.

Religious affiliation is listed on national identity cards, despite Article 24 of the 1982 constitution which forbids the compulsory disclosure of religious affiliation. Members of some religious groups, such as the Baháʼí, are unable to state their religious affiliation on their cards because it is not included among the option, and thus must report their religion as "unknown" or "other".

Treatment of Muslims 
The Turkish government oversees Muslim religious facilities and education through its Directorate of Religious Affairs, under the authority of the Prime Minister. The directorate regulates the operation of the country's 77,777 registered mosques and employs local and provincial imams (who are civil servants). Sunni imams are appointed and paid by the state. Historically, Turkey's Alevi Muslim minority has been discriminated against within the country. However, since the 2000s, various measures granting Alevis more equal recognition as a religious group have been passed at the local and national levels of government. Other Muslim minorities, such as Shia Muslims, largely do not face government interference in their religious practice, but also receive no support from the state.

Since the 2000s Turkish Armed Forces have dismissed several members for alleged Islamic fundamentalism.

Treatment of other religious groups 
In the 1970s, the Turkish High Court of Appeals issued a ruling allowing for the expropriation of properties acquired after 1936 from religious minorities. Later rulings in the 2000s have restored some of this property, and generally allow minorities to acquire new properties. However, the government has continued to apply an article allowing it to expropriate properties in areas where the local non-Muslim population drops significantly or where the foundation is deemed to no longer perform the function for which it was created. There is no specific minimum threshold for such a population drop, which is left to the discretion of the GDF. This is problematic for small populations (such as the Greek Orthodox community), since they maintain more properties than the local community needs; many are historic or significant to the Orthodox world.

Greek Orthodox, Armenian Orthodox and Jewish religious groups may operate schools under the supervision of the Education Ministry. The curricula of the schools include information unique to the cultures of the groups. The Ministry reportedly verifies if the child's father or mother is from that minority community before the child may enroll. Other non-Muslim minorities do not have schools of their own.

Churches operating in Turkey generally face administrative challenges to employ foreign church personnel, apart from the Catholic Church and congregations linked to the diplomatic community. These administrative challenges, restrictions on training religious leaders and difficulty obtaining visas have led to a decrease in the Christian communities. Jehovah's Witnesses have faced imprisonment and harassment, largely connected to their religiously grounded conscientious objection to obligatory military service.

Turkmenistan

The Constitution of Turkmenistan provides for freedom of religion and does not establish a state religion. However, the Government imposes legal restrictions on all forms of religious expression. All religious groups must register in order to gain legal status; unregistered religious activity is illegal and may be punished by administrative fines. While the 2003 law on religion and subsequent 2004 amendments had effectively restricted registration to only the two largest groups, Sunni Muslim and Russian Orthodox, and criminalized unregistered religious activity, presidential decrees issued in 2004 dramatically reduced the numerical thresholds for registration and abolished criminal penalties for unregistered religious activity; civil penalties remain. As a result, nine minority religious groups were able to register, and the Turkmenistan government has permitted some other groups to meet quietly with reduced scrutiny.

Ethnic Turkmen identity is linked to Islam. Ethnic Turkmen who choose to convert to other religious groups, especially the lesser-known Protestant groups, are viewed with suspicion and sometimes ostracized, but Turkmenistan society historically has been tolerant and inclusive of different religious beliefs.

United Arab Emirates 

The constitution of the United Arab Emirates establishes Islam as the state religion. While it establishes the freedom of worship (so long as it does not interfere with public policy or morals), there are laws against blasphemy, and against proselytizing by non-Muslims.

Legal framework 
According to the constitution, sharia is the principal source of legislation, although the judicial system applies two types of law, depending on the case. Sharia forms the basis for judicial decisions in most family law matters for Muslims, such as marriage and divorce, and inheritance for both Muslims and non-Muslims; however, in the case of noncitizens, the parties may petition the court to have the laws of their home country apply, rather than sharia. Sharia also applies in some criminal matters. Civil law provides the basis for decisions on all other matters. Shia Muslims in Dubai may pursue Shia family law cases through a special Shia council rather than through the regular judicial system. When sharia courts try non-Muslims for criminal offenses, judges have the discretion to impose civil or sharia penalties. Higher courts may overturn or modify sharia penalties.

Authorities conduct arrests under blasphemy and antidiscrimination laws that criminalize insulting religions. The Awqaf provides weekly guidance for the content of sermons in Sunni mosques, and the government regulates and actively monitors the issuance of all fatwas at both the national and emirate levels. Shia mosques continued to receive guidance from the Awqaf but were considered private and managed primarily by the Jaafari Affairs Council, located in Dubai. The government continued to allow private worship of other religious groups and granted permission to build houses of worship on a case-by-case basis.

General restrictions 
The law prohibits blasphemy, defined as any act insulting God, religions, prophets, messengers, holy books, or houses of worship. Offenders are subject to imprisonment for five or more years and fines from 250,000 AED ($68,000) to two million AED ($545,000); noncitizens may be deported.

The law prohibits black magic, sorcery, and incantations, which are punishable by a prison term ranging from six months to three years, and deportation for noncitizens. The law does not directly prohibit Muslims from converting to other religions; however, the penal code defers to sharia on matters defined as crimes in Islamic doctrine, which in many interpretations prohibits apostasy.

The law requires Muslims and non-Muslims to refrain from eating, drinking, and smoking in public during fasting hours during the month of Ramadan.

The law prohibits the distribution of religious literature the government determines is contradictory to Islam, as well as literature it deems blasphemous or offensive towards religions.

Restrictions on minority religions 
The law prohibits churches from erecting bell towers or displaying crosses or other religious symbols on the outside of their premises, although they may place signs on their properties indicating they are churches. The law also restricts land ownership to citizens, or companies majority-owned by citizens. This effectively prevents most minority religious communities (which consist of noncitizens) from purchasing property to build houses of worship.
Under the law, Muslim men may marry non-Muslim women who are “people of the book” (Christian or Jewish). Muslim women may not marry non-Muslim men. Non-Muslim men and Muslim women who marry are subject to arrest, trial, and imprisonment on grounds of engaging in extramarital sex, which carries a minimum sentence of one year in jail, as the marriage is considered invalid. In the event of a divorce between a Muslim father and non-Muslim mother, the law grants child custody to the Muslim father. Non-Muslim wives of citizens are also ineligible for naturalization.

Education 
Islamic studies are mandatory for all students in public schools and for Muslim students in private schools. The government does not provide instruction in any religion other than Islam in public schools. In private schools, non-Muslim students are not required to attend Islamic study classes. All students, however, are required to take national social studies classes, which include some teaching on Islam. A small number of Christian-affiliated schools are authorized to provide instruction tailored to the religious background of the student.

Societal attitudes 
According to non-Muslim religious groups, there was a high degree of tolerance within society for minority religious beliefs and traditions, although societal attitudes and behavior discouraged conversion from Islam. Conversion to Islam was encouraged, however.

Anti-Semitic materials are frequently available for purchase at book fairs. There were continued instances of anti-Semitic remarks on social media sites.

Uzbekistan

The Constitution of Uzbekistan provides for freedom of religion and for the principle of separation of church and state. However, the government restricts these rights in practice. The government permits the operation of what it considers mainstream religious groups, including approved Muslim groups, Jewish groups, the Russian Orthodox Church, and various other Christian denominations, such as Roman Catholics, Lutherans, and Baptists. Uzbek society generally tolerates Christian churches as long as they do not attempt to win converts among ethnic Uzbeks. The law prohibits or severely restricts activities such as proselytizing, importing and disseminating religious literature, and offering private religious instruction.

A number of minority religious groups, including congregations of some Christian denominations, operate without registration because they have not satisfied the strict requirements set by the law. As in previous periods, Protestant groups with ethnic Uzbek members reported operating in a climate of harassment and fear. The government has been known to arrest and sentence Protestant pastors, and to otherwise raid and harass some unregistered groups, detaining and fining their leaders and members.

The government works against unauthorized Islamic groups suspected of extremist sentiments or activities, arresting numerous alleged members of these groups and sentencing them to lengthy jail terms. Many of these were suspected members of Hizb ut-Tahrir, a banned extremist Islamic political movement, the banned Islamic group Akromiya (Akromiylar), or unspecified Wahhabi groups. The government generally does not interfere with worshippers attending sanctioned mosques and granted approvals for new Islamic print, audio, and video materials. A small number of "underground" mosques operated under the close scrutiny of religious authorities and the security service.

Religious groups enjoyed generally tolerant relations; however, neighbors, family, and employers often continued to pressure ethnic Uzbek Christians, especially recent converts and residents of smaller communities. There were several reports of sermons against missionaries and persons who converted from Islam.

Vietnam

The constitution formally allows religious freedom. Every citizen is declared to be allowed to freely follow no, one, or more religions, practice his or her religion without violating the law, be treated equally regardless of his or her religion, be protected from being violated his or her religious freedom, but is prohibited to use religion to violate the law.

All religious groups and most clergy must join a party controlled supervisory body, religions must obtain permission to build or repair houses of worship, run schools, engage in charity or ordain or transfer clergy, and some clergy remain in prison or under serious state repression.

Yemen 

The constitution declares Islam the state religion and sharia the source of all legislation in Yemen. It provides for freedom of thought and expression “within the limits of the law,” but does not mention freedom of religion. The law prohibits denunciation of Islam, conversion from Islam to another religion, and proselytizing directed at Muslims. As a consequence of the ongoing Yemeni Civil War, the Cabinet of Yemen affiliated with former president Abdrabbuh Mansur Hadi only controls a portion of the country and is unable to enforce its laws elsewhere, with the Supreme Political Council, the Southern Transitional Council, and various Islamic fundamentalist groups controlling significant portions of the country. Violence from the conflict has resulted in the bombing destruction of many religious buildings by several different factions in the conflict.

Legal framework 
The constitution states the president must be Muslim (“practices his Islamic duties”); however, it allows non-Muslims to run for parliament, as long as they “fulfill their religious duties.” The law does not prohibit political parties based on religion, but it states parties may not claim to be the sole representative of any religion, oppose Islam, or restrict membership to a particular religious group.

The criminal code states “deliberate” and “insistent” denunciation of Islam or conversion from Islam to another religion is apostasy, a capital offense. The law allows those charged with apostasy three opportunities to repent; upon repentance, they are absolved from the death penalty. It is illegal to proselytize to Muslims.

Family law prohibits marriage between a Muslim and an individual whom the law defines as an apostate. Muslim women may not marry non-Muslims, and Muslim men may not marry women who do not practice one of the  Abrahamic religions. By law, a woman seeking custody of a child “ought not” to be an apostate; a man “ought” to be of the same faith as the child.

Supreme Political Council territories 

According to the UN, Baháʼí community members in Sana’a faced a “persistent pattern of persecution,” including arrest orders and pressure to recant their faith.

Prior to the outbreak of the military conflict, Christian community representatives reported increased scrutiny by Houthi rebels, leading them to be more discreet, although they continued to wear religious attire that identified them as members of the community.

In northern areas traditionally under Zaydi control, there were reports of continued Houthi efforts to impose their religious customs on non-Zaydi residents, including by banning music and requiring women to wear full veils.

Abdul-Malik al-Houthi has stated there is Israeli involvement in the Saudi-led coalition campaign against Houthi rebels in speeches featuring anti-Semitic slogans, in addition to other religiously sectarian rhetoric.

References 

Asia
Religion in Asia
Human rights in Asia